A chemical patent, pharmaceutical patent or drug patent is a patent for an invention in the chemical or pharmaceuticals industry. Strictly speaking, in most jurisdictions, there are essentially no differences between the legal requirements to obtain a patent for an invention in the chemical or pharmaceutical fields, in comparison to obtaining a patent in the other fields, such as in the mechanical field. A chemical patent or a pharmaceutical patent is therefore not a sui generis right, i.e. a special legal type of patent.

In the pharmaceutical industry, the patent protection of drugs and medicines is accorded a particular importance, because drugs and medicines can easily be copied or imitated (by analyzing a pharmaceutical substance) and because of the significant research and development spending and the high risks associated with the development of a new drug.

Chemical patents are different from other sources of technical information because of the generic, Markush structures contained within them, named after the inventor Eugene Markush who won a claim in the US in 1925 to allow such structures to be used in patent claims.  These generic structures are used to make the patent claim as broad as possible.

In the United States, patents on pharmaceuticals were considered unethical by the medical profession during most of the nineteenth-century. Drug patent terms in the US were extended from 17 to 20 years in 1994.

See also
 Compulsory licensing (patents)
 Criticism of pharmaceutical patents
 Evergreening
 Generic drug
 Supplementary protection certificate

References

Further reading
 European Commission, Pharmaceuticals, Sector Inquiry, 2008 (Public Consultation, Preliminary Report).
 "Patents and Pharmaceuticals", a paper given on 29 November 2008 at the Presentation of the Directorate-General of Competition's Preliminary Report of the Pharma-sector inquiry, by the Rt. Hon. Sir Robin Jacob
  India wins landmark patent battle, BBC News, March 9, 2005
 "HIV/AIDS, Patents and the TRIPS Agreement: Issues and Options", United States Congressional Research Service, July 27, 2001
 "Pharmaceutical Patent Term Extensions: A Brief Explanation", United States Congressional Research Service, January 31, 2002

External links
Patent Opposition Database, an online resource launched by Doctors without Borders as "a tool which can be used to explore how to challenge unfair patents and their negative impact on access to medicines."

Patent law
Science and law